Koreh (also Romanized as Koroh; also known as Kūr Au) is a village in Qaen Rural District, in the Central District of Qaen County, South Khorasan Province, Iran. At the 2006 census, its population was 365, in 127 families.

References 

Populated places in Qaen County